Georgi Georgiyevich Kolpakov (born 18 April 1979) is a former Russian professional footballer. He also holds Kazakhstani citizenship.

External links
 

1979 births
Living people
Russian footballers
Russian expatriate footballers
Expatriate footballers in Kazakhstan
Kazakhstan Premier League players
FC Aktobe players
FC Vostok players
FC Okzhetpes players
Russian expatriate sportspeople in Kazakhstan
Association football defenders